Weerakkody is a Sri Lankan surname and may refer to:

Ajith Weerakkody (born 1970), Sri Lankan former cricketer
Jayalath Weerakkody, commander of the Sri Lankan Air Force 1998–2002 and current Sri Lankan High Commissioner to Pakistan
Kapila Wijegunawardene (born 1964), Sri Lankan former cricketer 
Rohan Weerakkody (born 1968), Sri Lankan former cricketer